The 2019 WTA Premier tournaments are 21 of the tennis tournaments on the 2019 WTA Tour. The WTA Tour is the elite tour for women's professional tennis. The WTA Premier tournaments rank below the Grand Slam events and above the WTA International tournaments. They are divided into three levels: Premier Mandatory (Indian Wells, Miami, Madrid and Beijing), Premier 5 (Dubai, Rome, Canada, Cincinnati and Wuhan), and Premier (12 tournaments in Europe, United States and Australia).

Schedule

Premier

References 

WTA Premier tournaments
WTA Premier tournaments seasons